Oliver Chace (August 24, 1769 – May 21, 1852) was an American 18th and 19th-century businessman. He was the founder of several New England textile manufacturing companies in the early 19th century, including the Valley Falls Company, the original antecedent of Berkshire Hathaway, which as of 2019 is one of the largest and most valuable companies in the world.

Early life
Chace was born on August 24, 1769 in Swansea, Massachusetts, to Jonathan Chace and Mary Earle, members of well known Yankee families in New England who had come from England in 1630 in the Puritan fleet with Governor John Winthrop. Chace and his family were Quakers (Society of Friends).

Manufacturing career and legacy
As a young man, Chace worked as a carpenter for Samuel Slater, who established one of the first successful textile mills in the Americas at Pawtucket, Rhode Island in 1793. In 1806, Chace eventually started his own textile mill in Swansea, Massachusetts and then the Troy Cotton & Woolen Manufactory in 1813 in Fall River, Massachusetts and the Pocasset Manufacturing Company in 1821, also at Fall River. He later acquired and reorganized the Valley Falls Company in Valley Falls, Rhode Island in 1839.

The Valley Falls Company would eventually acquire the Albion Mills, Tar-Kiln Factory in Burrillville, Manville Mills in Rhode Island, and Moodus Cotton Factory in Connecticut.

Chace's sons and nephews would also be involved in the textile industry of Fall River, Massachusetts and Valley Falls, Rhode Island, as well as other locations in the area.

He was the father-in-law of Elizabeth Buffum Chace, a noted 19th-century activist in the anti-slavery, women's rights, and prison reform movements. Through her, he was the grandfather of the mathematician Arnold Buffum Chace and the author and activist Lillie Buffum Chace Wyman.

Chace died on May 21, 1852, and was buried in the Old Quaker Burial Ground in Providence on Olive Street.

Berkshire Hathaway
In 1929, the Valley Falls Company, and others, would combine with the Berkshire Manufacturing Company of Adams, Massachusetts to become Berkshire Fine Spinning Associates. In 1955, Berkshire Fine Spinning Associates would merge with Hathaway Manufacturing Company of New Bedford, Massachusetts to become Berkshire Hathaway.

Chace's descendant Malcolm Chace, Jr. was chairman of Berkshire Hathaway when investor Warren Buffett began buying stock in 1962. When Buffett took control of the company in 1965, Chace refused to sell his share and remained on the board of directors.

Personal life
Chace married Susanna Buffington on September 15, 1796. They had seven children together. Chace's two eldest sons, Harvey (born 1797) and Samuel Buffington (born 1800) would later follow their father into the textile business. Susanna Chace died on July 30, 1827. Oliver's second marriage was to Patience Robinson. They had no children.

See also
Oliver Chace's Thread Mill
Valley Falls Company
History of Fall River, Massachusetts
Elizabeth Buffum Chace

References

External links
John Kostrzew, "Rich and richer: Berkshire, Buffett and R.I.'s Chace family," Providence Journal, 7/10/2006
Chace Family
History of Valley Falls
Information on Oliver Chace, with portrait

1769 births
1852 deaths
American chief executives of manufacturing companies
American textile industry businesspeople
American financiers
American philanthropists
American Quakers
Businesspeople from Massachusetts
People from Fall River, Massachusetts
People from Somerset, Massachusetts
Berkshire Hathaway people
Burials in Rhode Island
People from Swansea, Massachusetts
19th-century American businesspeople